Ardeth or Ardith may refer to:

Ardeth G. Kapp (born 1931), was the ninth general president of the Young Women Organization of The Church of Jesus Christ of Latter-day Saints (LDS Church) from 1984 to 1992
Ardeth Platte (born 1936), American Dominican Religious Sister and anti-nuclear activist
Ardeth Wood (1975–2003), Canadian woman who was a graduate student at the University of Waterloo who was killed in a forcible drowning in the city of Ottawa
Ardith McPherson, American female deputy constable who worked in Texas' Harris County Constable's office
Ardith Melloh, Swedish female author of the 1981 book Grandfather's Songbooks, Or, The Psalmodikon in America
Ardith Dondanville Todd, American actress who played a character in the 1939 film The Wizard of Oz

Fictional characters
Ardeth Bay, a fictional male character who has appeared in The Mummy movie series
Ardeth, the ex wife of Jay Sherman in the cartoon The Critic

See also
Ardeth Lake, an alpine lake in Boise County, Idaho, United States
Ardeth Lake (California), a lake in Tuolumne County, California

Hebrew feminine given names